Bréville-les-Monts is a commune in the Calvados department in the Normandy region in northwestern France. It was the location for the Battle of Bréville fought by the 6th Airborne Division during the Second World War.

History
The town was formerly called Bréville, and was officially renamed Bréville-les-Monts on August 26, 2004.

Population

Twin towns
Hillerse in Germany

See also
Communes of the Calvados department

References

Communes of Calvados (department)
Calvados communes articles needing translation from French Wikipedia